Ustinovo is a rural locality (a village) in Dvurechenskoye Rural Settlement, Permsky District, Perm Krai, Russia. The population was 548 as of 2010. There are 25  streets.

Geography 
Ustinovo is located 16 km south of Perm (the district's administrative centre) by road. Subbotino is the nearest rural locality.

References 

Rural localities in Permsky District